was the pen-name of a novelist in Shōwa period Japan, known primarily for his biographical works and works on literary history. His real name was Fujio Hirai.

Noguchi was born in Kōjimachi, Tokyo, and studied at Keio University. His first published work was a novel about the pathos in the lives of common people, Kaze no keifu ("Genealogy of the Wind", 1940).

In the post-World War II period, he turned to works biography and literary history, with Tokuda Shusei den ("Biography of Tokuda Shusei", 1965) about the noted author. This was followed by Kurai yoru no watashi ("Myself on a Dark Night", 1969), describing the literary world in Japan during the 1920s and 1930s. His biography of Nagai Kafu Waga Kafu ("My Kafu", 1969), was awarded the Yomiuri Prize. In 1981 he was awarded the Japan Art Academy Prize, and in 1986, he published Kanshokuteki Shōwa bundan shi ("An Impressionistic History of Shōwa Literature").

See also 
 Japanese literature
 List of Japanese authors

References

1911 births
1993 deaths
Japanese writers
Japanese non-fiction writers
People from Tokyo
Yomiuri Prize winners
20th-century non-fiction writers
20th-century pseudonymous writers
Presidents of the Japan Writers’ Association